Baghuyeh (also Romanized as Bāghūyeh; also known as Bāghu and Bāqū) is a village in Moqam Rural District, Shibkaveh District, Bandar Lengeh County, Hormozgan Province, Iran. At the 2006 census, its population was 112, in 18 families.

References 

Populated places in Bandar Lengeh County